The Presbytery of Aberdeen and Shetland  is one of the forty-two presbyteries of the Church of Scotland, being the local presbytery for the city of Aberdeen. The current moderator is the Rev Hutton Steel  who is minister of High Hilton Parish Church. The presbytery represents and supervises thirty six Church of Scotland congregations within the city. The office is at Mastrick Parish Church.

The role of Presbytery Clerk is held by the Rev Dr John A Ferguson.
On 1 June 2020 the presbytery merged with Shetland Presbytery becoming the Presbytery of Aberdeen and Shetland with Shetland reducing its parishes to one, covering all the islands.
There is currently a consultation process with a view to further mergers in the North East of Scotland.  This forms part of the Church of Scotland's wider aim of reducing the number of presbyteries to around 12.

Parishes

Outlying parishes

See also

List of Church of Scotland parishes
List of Church of Scotland synods and presbyteries
Presbytery of Europe
Presbytery of Glasgow

References

External links
Presbytery Website
Church of Scotland

Christianity in Aberdeen
Aberdeen
Organisations based in Aberdeen